"Je ne veux qu'elle" is a 2002 pop song recorded by French singer Marc Lavoine as a duet with actress Claire Keim. It was the fourth and last single off his eighth studio album Marc Lavoine and was released in November 2002. It was a top ten single in France and was also a hit in Belgium (Wallonia) and Switzerland.

Song information
The song was co-written by J. Kapler, Jean-Jacques Goldman's brother and Marc Lavoine and composed by J. Kapler, and helped launch the career of Claire Keim, who was mostly unknown before this duet. Both singers performed the song during Lavoine's 2003 tour and their live version is available on the album Olympia Deuxmilletrois. The song is also included on Lavoine's best of Les Duos de Marc and La collection de Marc, both released in 2007.

The song was covered by Gérard Darmon and Julie Zenatti for Les Enfoirés' 2006 album Le Village des Enfoirés and included in a medley named "Medley Séduction".

In France, the single went straight to a peak of No. 9 on 9 November 2002, thus becoming Lavoine's third top ten hit in the SNEP chart. It then dropped and remained for 17 weeks in the top 50 and 23 weeks in the top 100. In Belgium (Wallonia), the single was ranked for 16 weeks on the Ultratop 50 and reached No. 14 in its second week, on 23 November 2002. In Switzerland, the song peaked at No. 34 on 12 January 2003 and stayed in the top 100 for 15 weeks.

In 2002, "Je ne veux qu'elle" was the 63rd most aired song on radio in France, and the music video was the 127th most broadcast on television.

Track listings
 CD single

 Digital download (since 2005)

Credits

 Arrangements and direction of strings : Jean-François Berger
 Artistic direction : Egidio Alves Martins
 Acoustic guitar : Hugh Burns
 Bass : Laurent Vernerey
 Dobro : Jean-Pierre Bucolo
 Electric guitar : Philippe Russo
 First violin : Perry Montague-Mason

 Strings : Isabel Griffiths
 Assistant : Thomas Sandoval
 Programmations : Mathew Vaughan
 Recorded by François Delabrière
 Mixed by François Delabrière at Mega studio
 Mastering @ Metropolis by Ian Cooper
 Produced by François Delabrière, Jean-François Berger and Marc Lavoine

Charts

Peak positions

Year-end charts

References

External links
 "Je ne veux qu'elle, official music video on Claire Keim's site (See: "Chansons" => "Je ne veux qu'elle" => "Pour visionner le clip, cliquer ici. Format RealPlayer – Durée 4 minutes – 2,9 Mo")

2001 songs
2002 singles
Marc Lavoine songs
Male–female vocal duets
Songs written by Marc Lavoine
Songs written by Robert Goldman (songwriter)